Walter Maxwell West Sr. (July 14, 1904 in Sunset, Texas – April 25, 1971 in Houston, Texas), was a professional baseball player who played outfielder in the Major Leagues for the  Brooklyn Robins during the 1928 and 1929 baseball seasons. He attended the University of North Texas.

External links

1904 births
1971 deaths
Major League Baseball outfielders
Baseball players from Texas
Brooklyn Robins players
North Texas Mean Green baseball players
Little Rock Travelers players
Mount Pleasant Cats players
Muskogee Athletics players
Waco Cubs players
Atlanta Crackers players
Newark Bears (IL) players
Jersey City Skeeters players
Toledo Mud Hens players
Fort Worth Cats players